Cheraghabad (also Romanized as Cherāghābād) is a village in Cheraghabad Rural District, Tukahur District, Minab County, Hormozgan Province, Iran. At the 2006 census, its population was 559, in 120 families.

References 

Populated places in Minab County